Cousin Wilbur is a 1939 Our Gang short comedy film directed by George Sidney.  It was the 179th Our Gang short (180th episode, 91st talking short, 92nd talking episode, and 11th MGM produced episode) that was released.

Plot
Against his will, Alfalfa invites his sissified Cousin Wilbur to join the All 4 One Club. The enterprising Wilbur immediately increases the membership by offering cash compensation (usually a penny or two) for every black eye and busted nose administered by Butch and Woim. When the two tough guys try to muscle in on the club, Wilbur surprises everyone by proving himself to be the best bare-knuckle fighter on the block.

Notes
This episode marked the return of Scotty Beckett, who was Spanky's sidekick from 1934 to 1935. Alfalfa, who joined the gang several months before Beckett left, replaced him at the end of that year. Beckett now returned as Alfalfa's nerdy cousin, replete the horn-rimmed glasses.

Cast

The Gang
 Scotty Beckett as Cousin Wilbur
 Eugene Lee as Porky
 Darla Hood as Darla
 George McFarland as Spanky
 Carl Switzer as Alfalfa
 Billie Thomas as Buckwheat

Additional cast
 Tommy Bond as Butch
 Sidney Kibrick as Woim
 Leonard Landy as Leonard
 Gary Jasgur as Slapsie
 Joe Geil as Kid with a black eye
 Philip Hurlic as Buckwheat's friend
 Mary Currier as Alfalfa's mother
 Freddie Chapman as Club member
 Payne Johnson as Club member
 Darwood Kaye as Club member
 Joe Levine as Club member
 Tommy McFarland as Club member
 Harold Switzer as Club member

See also
 Our Gang filmography

References

External links

1939 films
American black-and-white films
Films directed by George Sidney
Metro-Goldwyn-Mayer short films
1939 comedy films
Our Gang films
1939 short films
1930s English-language films
1930s American films